Desolation Sound Marine Provincial Park is a provincial park in British Columbia, Canada, and is located approximately 32 km north of Powell River and 150 km north of Vancouver.
This provincial marine park, which is about 84 km2 in size is only accessible by boat. It is distinguished by its many picturesque sheltered coves and anchorages, and is frequented by yachts and pleasure craft. The scenery consists of waterfalls, rugged glaciated peaks, and their steep forested slopes that fall into the ocean.

The park is located at the confluence of Malaspina Inlet and Homfray Channel. Its many inlets, islets, coves, and bays attract many pleasure craft each summer, when it is not uncommon for a hundred boats to share a small anchorage. The sound is home to a wide variety of wildlife and still relatively free from development, although some areas, such as Theodesia Inlet, show signs of clear-cut logging.

See also
 Desolation Sound
 Prideaux Haven

References

External links
 BC Parks - Desolation Sound Provincial Marine Park

Sunshine Coast (British Columbia)
Provincial Parks of the Discovery Islands
Provincial parks of British Columbia
1973 establishments in British Columbia
Protected areas established in 1973
Marine parks of Canada